Birendra Nath Katham is an Indian politician. He was elected to the Lok Sabha, lower house of the Parliament of India as a member of the Indian National Congress.

References

External links
Official biographical sketch in Parliament of India website

India MPs 1967–1970
India MPs 1952–1957
Lok Sabha members from West Bengal

1906 births

Year of death missing